The grated tryonia, also known as the White River snail, scientific name Tryonia clathrata, is a species of very small or minute freshwater snail with an operculum, an aquatic gastropod mollusk in the family Hydrobiidae. This species is endemic to the United States.

References

Endemic fauna of the United States
Tryonia
Gastropods described in 1865
Taxonomy articles created by Polbot